Wellmania is an upcoming Australian comedy-drama streaming television series co-created by Brigid Delaney and Benjamin Law for Netflix. Based on Delaney's novel, Wellmania: Misadventures in the Search for Wellness, it follows Liv Healy (Celeste Barber), a middle-aged woman who struggles with a "major health crisis" as she tries various methods to reclaim her well-being. The series is set to launch globally on the streaming platform on 29 March 2023.

Premise 
Liv Healy, a food blogger with an unhealthy lifestyle, recently receives an opportunity that forces her reevaluate her choices. Struggling with her previous habits, she tries various methods of healthy living in order to advance her career to varying levels of success.

Cast

Main 
 Celeste Barber as Liv Healy
 JJ Fong as Amy Kwan
 Genevieve Mooy as Lorraine Healy
 Lachlan Buchanan as Gaz Healy
 Remy Hii as Dalbert Tan
 Alexander Hodge as Isaac Huang
 Simone Kessell as Helen King
 Virginie Laverdure as Valerie Jones
 Johnny Carr as Doug Henderson

Recurring 

 Miranda Otto
 Leah Vandenberg
 Aden Young

Production

Development 
Netflix had ordered Wellmania, inspired by Brigid Delaney's novel, Wellmania: Misadventures in the Search for Wellness, on 11 December 2021 for an eight half-hour series. Delaney and Benjamin Law was announced as co-creators, with Law serving as executive producer. Celeste Barber, Belinda King, Bree-Anne Sykes, in addition to Chris Oliver-Taylor and Warren Clarke from Fremantle, would also join Law as an executive producer. Additionally, Romina Accurso, Nick Coyle, and Amy Stewart were announced as series' writers. On 23 March 2022, Erin White and Helena Brooks were unveiled as the series directors.

Casting 
Upon series announcement on 11 December 2021, Celeste Barber was also announced to play the series' lead. On 21 March 2022, it was revealed that JJ Fong, Genevieve Mooy, Lachlan Buchanan, Remy Hii, Alexander Hodge, Simone Kessell, Johnny Carr, and Virginie Laverdure would join Barber as the main casts of the series. Additionally, Miranda Otto, Leah Vandenberg, and Aden Young would also appear on undisclosed capacities.

Filming 
Principal photography of the series were announced on 11 December 2021, with Cadigal unveiled as one of the shooting locations. On 21 March 2022, Dan Freene was revealed as the series cinematographer.

Release 
Wellmania is scheduled to premiere globally on 29 March 2023.

Marketing 
First trailer of the series was launched on YouTube on 15 February 2023.

References

External links
 
 

2020s Australian comedy television series
2020s Australian drama television series
2023 Australian television series debuts
Alternative medicine
Australian comedy-drama television series
English-language Netflix original programming
Television series about journalism
Television series based on novels
Television series by Fremantle (company)
Television shows based on Australian novels
Television shows filmed in Australia
Television shows set in Sydney
Upcoming comedy television series
Upcoming drama television series
Upcoming Netflix original programming